The Propaganda and Training Board of the Lao People's Revolutionary Party's Central Committee (LPRP) was established in 1951 as an organ of the Indochinese Communist Party, and established in its current form in 1964. It is responsible for organising and leading the party's propaganda work.

The Head of the Central Committee Propaganda and Training Board is by right of office member of the LPRP Central Committee. The current head, Khamphanh Pheuyavong, is a member of the 11th Central Committee and the 11th Secretariat.

Organisational structure
 Administrative Office
 Department on Organisation and Personnel
 Department on Advertising
 Department on Training
 Department on General Affairs
 Department Journal
 Theoretical journal Alun Mai.

Heads

References

External links
 Website

Central Committee apparatus of the Lao People's Revolutionary Party
1951 establishments in Laos